Qiannan Buyei and Miao Autonomous Prefecture (Buyei: Qianfnanf Buxqyaix Buxyeeuz ziqziqzouy; Hmu: Qeef Naif Dol Yat Dol Hmub Zid Zid Zeb) is an autonomous prefecture of Guizhou province, People's Republic of China, bordering Guangxi to the south. The name "" derives from the prefecture's south-central location in the province; "" is the official abbreviation for Guizhou, while "" means "south".

Demographics 
According to the 2000 Census, Qiannan Prefecture has 3,569,847 inhabitants with a population density of 136.22 inhabitants/km2; at the 2010 Census, it had 3,232,714 inhabitants.

Ethnic groups in Qiannan, 2000 census

Subdivisions
The prefecture is subdivided into 12 county-level divisions: 2 county-level cities, 9 counties, and 1 autonomous county.

County-level cities: 
Duyun City
Fuquan City
Counties: 
Guiding County
Huishui County
Luodian County
Weng'an County
Libo County
Longli County
Pingtang County
Changshun County
Dushan County
Autonomous county: 
Sandu Shui Autonomous County

References

 
Cities in Guizhou
Autonomous prefectures of the People's Republic of China
Prefecture-level divisions of Guizhou
Miao autonomous prefectures